Peter Stilsbury (born 4 February 1958) is an Australian former professional wrestler, best known for appearing in the World Wrestling Federation as Outback Jack from 1986 to 1988. He portrayed a northern Australian bushman coming to America to compete in the WWF.

Professional wrestling career

Early career
Stilsbury started his career in Canada with Stu Hart's Stampede Wrestling in November 1986. He was brought into the WWF that month in response to the mainstream popularity of the Australian film Crocodile Dundee. Wearing an Australian bush jacket, he appeared in several vignettes hyping his debut by showing him in the wilds of the Australian Outback—specifically, the Northern Territory. In the vignettes, he drove a Jeep and drank beer with cows. In addition, as part of the storyline, he claimed to have learned survival skills from the Aborigines.

World Wrestling Federation (1986–1988)
Stilsbury made his WWF debut in November 1986, as Outback Jack. His wins mainly came over jobbers such as Jose Estrada, Steve Lombardi, Barry O, Barry Horowitz and "Iron" Mike Sharpe. However, Outback Jack also defeated well-known superstars such as Nikolai Volkoff and former WWE Champion The Iron Sheik. Eventually, Stilsbury started becoming a jobber himself, losing matches to high-level superstars such as "Million Dollar Man" Ted DiBiase and Rick Rude. Outback Jack feuded with Frenchy Martin, and the two had matches featured on the 4 May and 25 May 1987 episodes of WWF Prime Time Wrestling. Outback Jack won both matches. During this time, he also feuded with Killer Khan.

On the 3 August 1987 episode of WWF Prime Time Wrestling, Outback Jack rescued Tito Santana from an attack by Ron Bass. This led to a match between Outback Jack and Bass later in the show. Bass won, and the pair continued to face each other into the following year. Outback Jack made one appearance on the interview segment The Snake Pit with Jake "The Snake" Roberts, on 6 June 1987.

On the 7 May 1988 episode of WWF Superstars of Wrestling, Outback Jack competed in his final televised match teaming with Brady Boone and Steve Blackman in a loss to The Islanders; this was the only match in which The Islanders competed as a team of three, as they were joined by new Islander Siva Afi. Outback Jack's brief career concluded at the only wrestling event held in Kissimmee, Florida's Tupperware Convention Center, on the evening of 15 May 1988. The outcome of his rematch with Greg Valentine remains a mystery although Valentine had pinned him three days prior at the Columbus Municipal Auditorium.

Post-World Wrestling Federation
The WWF had LJN Wrestling Superstars create an Outback Jack action figure to be produced and distributed worldwide. In 2003, Pro Wrestling Illustrated published a list of the top 400 wrestlers in WWE history; Stilsbury was ranked No. 371. Stilsbury stated in an interview that he does not often think about his time with the World Wrestling Federation.

In recent years, Stilsbury has been involved in Highland Games caber tossing events in Florida. His eyesight has been declining, and he is now blind in one eye and has limited vision in his other. His sudden departure from the WWF has led to him being described as "one of the most asked about people in the business".

References

External links

1958 births
20th-century professional wrestlers
Australian expatriate sportspeople in the United States
Australian male professional wrestlers
Australian blind people
American blind people
Living people
Professional wrestlers from Florida
Sportsmen from Victoria (Australia)
Sportspeople with a vision impairment
Stampede Wrestling alumni